Javier León (born 30 July 1953) is a former Peruvian wrestler who had competed in the 1972 Summer Olympics.

References

External links
 

1953 births
Living people
Olympic wrestlers of Peru
Wrestlers at the 1972 Summer Olympics
Peruvian male sport wrestlers
20th-century Peruvian people